The 2007–08 Hong Kong First Division League season was the 96th since its establishment. The first match was played on 2 September 2007 with South China lost to Kitchee 1–2.

In this season, the First Division League was composed of 10 teams. Workable were  promoted from the Second Division while Eastern, originally demoted to Third Division League by rule, was invited by HKFA to play in the First Division League after securing sufficient sponsorship.

League table

Full table

Home matches only

Note: Here is the home stadium list of the teams:
Dongguan Stadium – Lanwa Redbull
Hong Kong Stadium & Mong Kok Stadium – Rest of the teams

Away matches only

Teams
The following 10 clubs are competing in the Hong Kong First Division League during the 2007–08 season.

Kits

Fixtures and results
All times are Hong Kong Time (UTC+8).

Round 1

Round 2

Round 3

Round 4

Round 5

Round 6

Round 7

Round 8

Round 9

Round 10

Round 11

Round 12

Round 13

Round 14

Round 15

Round 16

Round 17

Round 18

Scorers
 19 goals
 Detinho (South China)

 12 goals
 Giovane (Convoy Sun Hei)

 11 goals
 Maxwell (South China)

 10 goals
 Wang Xuanhong (Citizen)

 8 goals
 Rodrigo (Eastern)
 Junior (Wofoo Tai Po)

 7 goals
 Tomy (Happy Valley)
 Annan (Wofoo Tai Po)
 Rafeal (Wofoo Tai Po)

 6 goals
 Leko (Citizen)
 Paulo (Eastern)
 Chan Siu Ki (Kitchee)
 Goran Stankovski (Kitchee)
 Joel (Wofoo Tai Po)

 5 goals
 Aldo Villalba (Lanwa Redbull)
 Chao Pengfei (Happy Valley)
 Julius Akosah (Kitchee)
 Roberto Fronza (Workable)

 4 goals
 Liang Zicheng (Bulova Rangers)
 Chan Yiu Lun (Convoy Sun Hei)
 Fábio (Eastern)
 Godfred (Bulova Rangers/Happy Valley)
 Anibal Pacheco Orzuza (Lanwa Redbull)
 Lin Zhong (Lanwa Redbull)
 Schutz (South China)
 Au Yeung Yiu Chung (Workable)

 3 goals
 Lam Ka Wai (Bulova Rangers)
 Marcio (Citizen)
 Ronan (Citizen)
 Batoum Roger (Convoy Sun Hei)
 Diego (Happy Valley)
 Poon Yiu Cheuk (Happy Valley)
 Anderson da Silva (Kitchee)
 Jaimes McKee (Kitchee)
 Itaparica (South China)
 Kwok Kin Pong (South China)
 Li Haiqiang (South China)

Only scorers with 3 goals or above are listed here.

External links
The Hong Kong Football Association official site

Hong Kong First Division League seasons
1